Orzea River may refer to:

 Orzea, a tributary of the Râușor in Romania
 Orzea, a tributary of the Ialomița in Romania